The men's beach soccer tournament at the 2019 World Beach Games in Doha, Qatar, the inaugural edition of the ANOC World Beach Games, took place over six days from 11–16 October. Held in tandem with the women's tournament, the two events comprised the beach soccer competition at this year's Games. 

Organised by the Association of National Olympic Committees (ANOC), national associations of FIFA (beach soccer's governing body) from a territory with a National Olympic Committee (NOC) were invited to enter one team into preliminary qualification routes from which 16 teams, representing all six continental zones, advanced to the final competition; the hosts Qatar did not enter a team.

The tournament was a multi-stage competition, consisting of a round-robin group stage and followed by a single elimination knockout round, starting with the semi-finals and ending with the gold medal match, with all matches hosted on the Katara Beach. 

Brazil claimed the gold medal after winning the final 9–3 against Russia who settled for silver. Meanwhile, Iran defeated Italy in the bronze medal match to claim the remaining place on the podium.

Competition schedule
The tournament began on 11 October, one day before the opening ceremony, and ended on the final day of the Games, 16 October. 

Matches deciding medal winners took place exclusively on 16 October.

Qualified teams

The six continental zones of FIFA were each allocated a share of 16 berths at the Games, ensuring all continents would be represented at the event. The following teams qualified from their zones via regional preliminary tournaments or based on their world ranking (hosts Qatar were eligible to enter a team automatically however declined to enter):

a. Tahiti are the highest ranked team from the OFC. However, they are ineligible to enter since French Polynesia is not a member of ANOC. Therefore, the berth has been given to the OFC's next highest ranked team that is a member.
b. The dates of teams who qualified via their world ranking refer to when they were publicly revealed by the qualification organisers.

Venues

The matches were held on the Katara Beach at the Beach Soccer Arena which consisted of two venues: the larger-capacity main stadium that hosted the majority of games and located adjacent, a smaller-capacity secondary stadium known as "Pitch 1" for all other matches which was only used during the group stage.

Squads

Each team could enter a squad consisting of up to 12 players. A total of up to 192 athletes were expected to compete.

Draw
The draw to split the 16 teams into four groups of four took place at 10:00 AST (UTC+3) on 27 August 2019 at the Lusail Sports Arena in Doha, Qatar. Beach Soccer Worldwide (BSWW) vice-president Joan Cusco oversaw the draw.

For the purpose of the draw, the 16 teams were split into four pots of four according to their world ranking with the highest ranked teams placed in Pot 1, down to the lowest ranked teams placed in Pot 4. One team from each pot was placed into each of the four groups. Teams from the same confederation could not be drawn into the same group, except for UEFA nations for which one group was permitted to contain two. At the start of the draw, two teams from Pot 1 were automatically allocated to the groups – Brazil, as the ranking leaders, were assigned to position A1 and Russia, as the second best ranked team, were assigned to position D1.

The composition of the pots is shown below (World Ranking in parentheses):

Group stage
Four of the 16 nations, the winners of each group, advance to the knockout stage.

All times are local, AST (UTC+3).

Group A

Group B

Group C

Group D

Knockout stage
The winners of Groups C and D contest are drawn to contest semi-final 1 and the winners of Groups A and B contest semi-final 2.

Semi-finals

Bronze medal match

Gold medal match

Top goalscorers
Players with at least four goals are listed

13 goals

 Gabriele Gori

10 goals

 Rodrigo

8 goals

 Nöel Ott

7 goals

 Mohammadali Mokhtari
 Artur Paporotnyi

6 goals

 Jose Vizcarra
 Mauricinho
 Aleksey Makarov
 Dejan Stankovic

5 goals

 Salavador "Chiky" Ardil
 Ozu Moreira
 Mamour Diagne
 Ramon Maldonado
 Catarino
 Filipe Silva
 Paolo Palmacci
 Masanori Okuyama
 Mostafa Kiani

4 goals

 Carlos Benitez
 Javi Torres
 Max Fa'ari
 Nassim El Hadoui
 Roy Mafane
 Mohammad Masoumizadeh
 Bokinha
 Fedor Zemskov

Source: BSRussia

Final standings

Source

See also
Beach soccer at the 2019 World Beach Games – Women's tournament
2019 FIFA Beach Soccer World Cup

References

External links
Beach Soccer, at ANOC World Beach Games Qatar (official website)
World Beach Games 2019, at Beach Soccer Worldwide
World Beach Games – Men's tournament, at Beach Soccer Russia (in Russian)

Men's